= Colegio Integral El Avila =

Private school in Venezuela

- Centro de Artes Integradas; Urb. Terrazas del Avila; Caracas, Edo. Miranda; Venezuela

Information
- Type: Private- from Preschool to Secondary (Bilingual: Spanish and English)
- Established: 1996
- Principal: Carlos Cedeño
- Grades: Preschool-Grade 11
- Enrollment: 710
- Accreditation: Ministerio de Educacion de la Republica Bolivariana de Venezuela
- Website: www.elavila.org/site

Colegio Integral El Avila is a bi-lingual private school located in Caracas, Venezuela, that provides its students with an education in art, science, and technology. It offers preschool, elementary, and secondary programs. The school Colegio Integral El Avila is located at Centro de Artes Integradas, Urbanizacion Terrazas del Avila, La Urbina Norte, Caracas, Venezuela.

== Campus and facilities ==
The school has the following facilities:

- Computer labs,
- Biology lab,
- Sports facilities: multi-purpose sport court and indoor sport court,
- Playgrounds,
- Libraries and Documentation Centre,
- Cafeteria,
- Pottery room,
- Washrooms for little children.

== History ==
The college was founded in 1996 by a group of parents and educators. The construction of the first building began on April 13, 1996 with the placement of the foundation stone. On September 30, 1996 the first school year of Colegio Integral el Avila began. The school building was under construction for three more years.

== Pre-school, elementary and secondary education ==
- Pre-school: Maternal, Prekinder, Kinder, and Preparatorio.
- Elementary: Grade 1 to grade 9.
- Secondary: Grade 10 to grade 11.

Each grade has two classrooms.

== Number of students per class ==
- Preschool: 20 students.
- Elementary and secondary: 25 students.

== Services ==
The main services offered by the school Colegio Integral El Avila are:

ESL education

The students receive English classes every day.

Orientation Department

The school has a team of psychologists that provides academic, emotional and social support to students.

Religion formation

There is a religion instruction from Preschool to Secondary. The majority of the community is Catholic, and they have a chaplain that guides the celebration of the liturgical year. Additionally, the school attends to the needs of the Jewish community.

Schools of art and music

The school Colegio Integral El Avila has a curriculum of artistic and cultural education from Preschool to Secondary in flute, cuatro (a typical instrument of Venezuela), guitar, piano, ceramic, drama, plastic arts, sculpture, and folklore.

Access to technology

The students have access to computer and telecommunication tools.

Mixed education

The children are educated in a mixed environment. The school has activities for both girls and boys, especially in sports and extracurricular activities.

Cultural, scientific, and sport activities

There are groups and clubs dedicated to cultural, scientific and sport activities. The activities take place during the regular school day.

Library and documentation centre

The school has two libraries and one documentation centre that supports any activity that requires information resources or bibliographic services.

School calendar The school Colegio Integral El Avila has 200 days of classes.

Full-time program The full school day is divided in two parts:

- Academic schedule: 8:00 am – 3:30 pm
- Complementary schedule: 3:30 pm – 5:30 pm

All activities start at 8:00 am and end at 12:15 pm in Preschool, and at 3:30 pm in Elementary and Secondary.

School cafeteria

The school has a space where the students from Elementary to Secondary can eat their lunches every day. At the moment, the food is provided by an external service.
